10th Avenue Freakout is the third studio album by American indie rock band Fog. It was released on Lex Records on March 22, 2005.

Critical reception

At Metacritic, which assigns a weighted average score out of 100 to reviews from mainstream critics, 10th Avenue Freakout received an average score of 78, based on 11 reviews, indicating "generally favorable reviews".

Ben Peterson of AllMusic gave the album 4 stars out of 5, describing it as "a rhythmic, up-front electronic-pop album, much less pensive and subdued than Fog's previous full-length, Ether Teeth." He called it "consistently imaginative and never predictable." Liz Cordingley of XLR8R said: "Volleying between forceful and quirky, the avant-garde approach of this album gets closer to the human side of jazz than any digitized hip-hop beat." Ron Hart of Billboard called it "the most adventurous work in the Fog catalog yet."

Track listing

Personnel
Credits adapted from liner notes.

Fog
 Andrew Broder – lyrics, music, production, engineering, front cover concept
 Jeremy Ylvisaker – music, engineering
 Mark Erickson – lyrics (2), music
 Martin Dosh – music
 Michael Lewis – music
 Tim Glenn – music

Additional personnel
 Greg Lewis – trumpet (1), horns (2)
 Huntley Miller – processing (2, 4, 11, 13)
 George Cartwright – saxophone (3, 4, 12, 13)
 Adam Linz – bass guitar (3, 11, 12)
 Jaqueline Ferrier-Ultan – cello (6, 11, 12)
 Andrew Lafkas – bass guitar (6, 13)
 Julie Wellman – lyrics (7), vocals (7, 8)
 Adam Drucker – lyrics (9)
 Tom Herbers – production, engineering
 Ehquestionmark – sleeve artwork

References

External links
 

2005 albums
Lex Records albums
Fog (band) albums